Madderty is a village in Strathearn, Perth and Kinross. It lies on the former railway line connecting Perth and Crieff. The Gask Ridge and its Roman road lie to the south and the remains of Inchaffray Abbey to the north.

Madderty is mentioned in a charter of about 1200, at which time there was a church dedicated to Saint Ethernan in the village.

The prominent agricultural zoologist Dr Daniel MacLagan FRSE (1904-1991) was born on Williamstone Farm here and later ran the farm.

References

External links

 Gazetteer for Scotland

Villages in Perth and Kinross